Akright Projects Limited (APL) is a privately owned real estate development company in Uganda. It is a leading property development company in the country. APL is the largest indigenous property development company in Uganda.

History
In 1990, Anatoli Kamugisha founded his first company Kanoblic Group Limited, a real estate construction business. He borrowed money from friends to register his business. He won construction contracts from several reputable firms, including Sugar Corporation of Uganda Limited and the Norwegian Forestry Society. In 1999, he closed down Kanoblic and started Akright Projects Limited, a company that plans, designs, and constructs organized residential communities (satellite cities) in or near urban centers in Uganda, as an alternative to the mushrooming slum problem in Uganda's cities and towns. The shares of stock of Akright are owned by Kamugisha and members of his family. The majority of senior managers in the company are also family members.

Kakungulu Housing Estate

In 2002, Akright acquired  of land from the descendants of Prince Badru Kakungulu for the development of the company's largest planned housing estate in the country to-date, Akright Kakungulu Housing Estate.

References

External links
 Website of Akright Projects Limited

See also
 Association of Real Estate Agents Uganda
 Mortgage bank
 Wakiso District
 Anatoli Kamugisha
 List of wealthiest people in Uganda

Wakiso District
Real estate companies established in 1999
1999 establishments in Uganda
Real estate companies of Uganda